NH 119 may refer to:

 National Highway 119 (India)
 New Hampshire Route 119, United States